Second Class Citizen is a 1974 novel by Nigerian writer Buchi Emecheta, first published in London by Allison and Busby. It was subsequently published in the US by George Braziller in 1975. A poignant story of a resourceful Nigerian woman who overcomes strict tribal domination of women and countless setbacks to achieve an independent life for herself and her children, the novel is often described as semi-autobiographical. The protagonist Adah's journey from Nigeria to London – where despite atrocious living conditions and a violent marriage, she "finds refuge in her dream of becoming a writer" – follows closely Emecheta's own trajectory as an author.

Plot summary
At the beginning of the novel, Adah is a child of an Ibo from Ibuza, Nigeria, living in Lagos. She dreams as a young girl of moving to the United Kingdom. After her father dies, Adah is sent to live with her uncle's family.

She is able to stay in school in Nigeria and attains employment working for the American consulate as a library clerk. The compensation from this job is enough to make her a desirable bride to Francis (her now husband) and in-laws.

Francis travels to the United Kingdom for several years to pursue the study of law. Adah convinces her husband's family that she and the children also belong in the UK. Francis believes they are second-class citizens in the United Kingdom as they are not citizens of the country. Adah finds employment working for another library and pays for their expenses, while also providing primary care for their children.

Later, we see Francis become increasingly abusive and dismissive of Adah as she pursues becoming a writer.

Critical reception
Second Class Citizen is well regarded as a story of overcoming struggle and of contemporary African life. On the novel's publication in 1974, Hermione Harris wrote in Race & Class: "Of the scores of books about race and black communities in Britain that had appeared during the 1960s and early 1970s, the great majority are written by white academic ultimately concerned with the relationship between white society and black 'immigrants'. Few accounts have emerged from those on the receiving end of British racism or liberalism of their own black experience. On the specific situation of black women there is almost nothing. Second Class Citizen is therefore something of a revelation."

A new edition of the book was published for the Penguin Modern Classics series in October 2020, after many years of being out of print. John Self in The Guardian wrote that, despite being on Granta's Best of Young British Novelists list in 1983, in subsequent years Emecheta "...didn't get the column inches. So it's a late justice that she is one of the few Granta alumni, alongside Martin Amis and Shiva Naipaul, to be promoted to the Penguin Modern Classics list."

References

1974 British novels
1974 Nigerian novels
Allison and Busby books
George Braziller books
Igboland in fiction
Nigerian English-language novels
Novels by Buchi Emecheta
Novels set in Lagos
Novels set in Nigeria
Postcolonial novels